The Show with No Name was a public-access television cable TV show in Austin, Texas, hosted by Charlie Sotelo and the mysterious "Cinco."  Each show featured clips of TV, film and music ephemera along with commentary by the hosts and calls from a predictably unruly public-access television audience.

Content
The clips were usually video snippets that captured a crazy moment of ephemeral history, such as Ed McMahon drunk on The Tonight Show, an early live TV appearance by Frank Zappa playing the bicycle and other found instruments, or the famously disastrous Andy Kaufman appearance on Fridays.  Often they were obscure cult favorites only circulated underground, such as Heavy Metal Parking Lot, the profane bloopers of an actor in a Winnebago sales video, or Corey Haim's Me, Myself, and I.  Many other clips simply presented a zeitgeist gone by: a trailer for an Akira Kurosawa or Sam Peckinpah film, a Bill Hicks comedy set, or Bob Dylan appearing on The Johnny Cash Show.

Format
Each clip was bracketed by skits and banter among hosts Charlie (always shown in a static headshot against a black background), Cinco (shown from the back at a sound console), and occasionally viewers who called in. Cinco, whose face is never shown on-air, had both a voice and a haircut similar to Howard Stern's -- this was never explained or commented on in the show, humorously creating the false impression that Cinco was Stern, slumming on local cable.

"The 10-year-old kid" (Luke Adams) was a recurring caller who would tell a Bill Hicks joke every time he was on air. During a Christmas episode Adams went live on air with Charlie and took viewer calls. Later, Adams also performed live at the Alamo Drafthouse for a Show With No Name Clip Show.

Impact and legacy
The show was enormously successful, given its small venue. It ran for 280 episodes over 8 years and won eight "Best of Austin" awards, as chosen by the editors and readers of The Austin Chronicle. It launched a series of popular live clip shows at the Alamo Drafthouse theater, including the memorable Raw, Uncensored and Totally Nude, which featured clips that the hosts deemed too controversial to air. It often courted controversy and was pulled from the air on at least two occasions.  Its devoted audience of local fans and out-of-towners who traded tapes was remarkable for a show that received no advertising, ran on Public-access television, and whose webpage was defiantly unhelpful (except when promoting a special event, it showed only a plain black page with a logo and no links or text). In a time before YouTube and before blogging, the video fragments featured on The Show With No Name were revelatory: moments that would have otherwise been lost to time and obscurity were given a clever and well-curated weekly forum.

References

External links
 
 
Compilation of off-air recordings on www.archive.org

Culture of Austin, Texas
Audiovisual ephemera
American public access television shows
Viral videos
Collage television